Matt Canada (born January 19, 1972) is an American football coach who is the offensive coordinator for the Pittsburgh Steelers of the National Football League (NFL). He previously served as the offensive coordinator and quarterbacks coach for Maryland, LSU, Pittsburgh, NC State, Wisconsin, Northern Illinois, Butler, Indiana, and the Pittsburgh Steelers.

Early life and education
Canada attended New Palestine High School in New Palestine, Indiana. He spent two years as the starting quarterback, throwing for 1,736 yards while leading his team to a 20–3 record. Canada then attended Indiana University Bloomington where he became a student assistant for the football program during his sophomore year.

Coaching career

Early career
Canada's coaching career includes early stints at Indiana, Butler, Northern Illinois and Wisconsin. In 2011, Canada served an integral role in leading Northern Illinois to the MAC championship, and he served an integral role in leading Wisconsin to the 2012 Big Ten Championship Game.

NC State
In 2013, Canada became offensive coordinator at NC State working under head coach Dave Doeren. Canada had previously worked under Doeren at Northern Illinois in 2011. After the 2014 season, Canada agreed to a new 3-year contract with NC State shortly after interviewing for the offensive coordinator job at Tennessee. He was subsequently let go by NC State following the 2015 season.

Pitt
In 2016, Canada was hired as offensive coordinator at Pitt. For his work during the 2016 season, he was named one of five finalists for the Broyles Award, given annually to the top assistant coach in college football.

LSU
On December 14, 2016, Canada was hired to become the offensive coordinator and quarterbacks coach at LSU. He held those positions for the 2017 season and on January 5, 2018, LSU and Canada mutually agreed to part ways.

Maryland
On January 22, 2018, Canada agreed to become the offensive coordinator at the University of Maryland.

On August 11, 2018, Canada became interim head coach for the Maryland Terrapins after D.J. Durkin was put on administrative leave following the death of Jordan McNair, an offensive lineman for the Maryland Terrapins. On November 17, 2018, Maryland came close to knocking off #3 ranked Ohio State, narrowly losing 52-51 in overtime. Maryland finished the season 5-7, failing to qualify for a bowl game. After Mike Locksley was hired as the permanent head coach at Maryland going forward, Canada was relieved of the day-to-day head coaching responsibilities. Canada was then replaced by Scottie Montgomery as offensive coordinator.

Pittsburgh Steelers
On January 15, 2020, Canada was hired by the Pittsburgh Steelers as their quarterbacks coach. 
On January 25, 2021, Canada was promoted to offensive coordinator of the Steelers, replacing Randy Fichtner.

Personal life
Canada earned his bachelor's in Business and master's degree in Sports Administration at Indiana University. He is married to Erin Canada.

Head coaching record

College

References

External links
 Pittsburgh Steelers bio

1972 births
Living people
Butler Bulldogs football coaches
Indiana Hoosiers football coaches
LSU Tigers football coaches
Maryland Terrapins football coaches
NC State Wolfpack football coaches
Northern Illinois Huskies football coaches
Pittsburgh Panthers football coaches
Pittsburgh Steelers coaches
Wisconsin Badgers football coaches
Indiana University Bloomington alumni
People from New Palestine, Indiana
Coaches of American football from Indiana
National Football League offensive coordinators